Juan Francisco Ruiz de Gaona y Portocarrero (Almagro, 13 February 1696 - Madrid, 4 February 1760), second Count of Valdeparaíso (Conde de Valdeparaíso) was a Spanish politician of the 18th century.

His father was Juan de Gaona y Abad, who was named Count of Valdeparaíso in 1705.
A knight of the Order of Calatrava, he married in 1734 with María Arias de Porres, Marquesa of Añavate.

He served as Minister of the Exchequer under Ferdinand VI of Spain, and under his patronage, the city of Almagro, Ciudad Real became capital of the intendencia (province) of La Mancha from 1750 to 1761.  He also built a palace in this city.

Counts of Spain
Economy and finance ministers of Spain
Government ministers of Spain
Knights of Calatrava
1696 births
1760 deaths